Michaelophorus bahiaensis is a species of moth in the genus Michaelophorus known from Brazil. The specific name is derived from the state of Bahia, whence the species is known.

References

Platyptiliini
Moths described in 2006
Endemic fauna of Brazil
Moths of South America